Tol is a village and municipality on Tol Island in Chuuk State in the Federated States of Micronesia.

References 

Municipalities of Chuuk State